History of the country

Until 1185, on the mountain where the village is now, stood a farmhouse, which belonged to the "gens Julia" (hence the name). Just that year the Emperor William the Good gave him, along with other houses, to the bishop of Monreale.

Its urban identity, however, develops from the FOURTEENTH century, when Giuliana was before the Ventimiglia and then the Peralta. In 1543, Emperor Charles V elevated the town to the rank of Marquisate. In 1640 the country passed from the Cordona to the Gioeni, until 1812, when the feudal system was abolished. With the historical re-enactment of the "Status Julianae" on August 3, 1997, the entire Giuliana community tried to regain possession of its memory, reviving the solemn ceremony which, in 1543, elevated it from county to Marquisate. «Paradigm of the event-says the historian Giuliana Antonino Giuseppe Marchese-was undoubtedly the castle Federiciano, just finished restoring, albeit partially, by the Superintendency of the B

Giuliana borders the following municipalities: Bisacquino, Caltabellotta, Chiusa Sclafani, Contessa Entellina, Sambuca di Sicilia. Ma

Demographic evolution

References

External links
 www.comunedigiuliana.it/

Municipalities of the Metropolitan City of Palermo